The Indian 100-rupee banknote (100) is a denomination of the Indian rupee. It has been in continuous production since Reserve Bank of India took over the functions of the controller of currency in India in 1935. The present 100 banknote in circulation is a part of the Mahatma Gandhi Series (which replaced the Lion Capital Series of banknotes in 1998). These notes are in circulation along with the Mahatma Gandhi New Series of banknotes which were introduced in July 2018.

History

The first 100-rupee note featured the portrait of George VI. After independence in 1947, Reserve Bank of India continued to issue the notes by replacing the portrait of George VI with the Emblem of India, as a part of the Lion Capital Series of banknotes.

Mahatma Gandhi New Series

On 10 November 2016, the Reserve Bank of India announced a new redesigned 100 banknote to be available as a part of the Mahatma Gandhi New Series. On 19 July 2018, the Reserve Bank of India unveiled the revised design of 100 banknote.

Design

The new bank note has a base color of Lavender with motif of Rani ki vav (Queen's stepwell) on the reverse side. Rani ki vav is located in Patan, Patan district, Gujarat, India. It is a UNESCO World Heritage Site. Dimensions of the bank note are measured at 142 mm × 66 mm.

Mahatma Gandhi Series

Design

The 100 banknote of the Mahatma Gandhi Series is 157 × 73 mm Blue-green coloured, with the obverse side featuring a portrait of Mahatma Gandhi with a signature of the governor of Reserve Bank of India.

As of 2012, the new  sign has been incorporated into banknote of 100. In January 2014 RBI announced that it would be withdrawing from circulation all banknotes printed prior to 2005 by 31 March 2014. The deadline was later extended to 1 January 2015, and then again to 30 June 2016.

Security features

The security features of the 100 banknote includes:

A windowed security thread that reads 'भारत' (Bharat in the Devanagari script) and 'RBI' alternately.
Latent image of the value of the banknote on the vertical band next to the right hand side of Mahatma Gandhi's portrait.
Watermark of Mahatma Gandhi that is a mirror image of the main portrait.
The number panel of the banknote is printed in embedded fluorescent fibers and optically variable ink.
Since 2005 additional security features like machine-readable security thread, electrotype watermark, and year of print appears on the bank note.

Languages

As like the other Indian rupee banknotes, the 100 banknote has its amount written in 17 languages. On the obverse, the denomination is written in English and Hindi. On the reverse is a language panel which displays the denomination of the note in 15 of the 22 official languages of India. The languages are displayed in alphabetical order. Languages included on the panel are Assamese, Bengali, Gujarati, Kannada, Kashmiri, Konkani, Malayalam, Marathi, Nepali, Odia, Punjabi, Sanskrit, Tamil, Telugu and Urdu.

References

 

Banknotes of India
Rupee
One-hundred-base-unit banknotes
Currencies introduced in 2018